Anna Motz (born 1964) is a Consultant Clinical and Forensic Psychologist with extensive clinical experience with women as perpetrators of violence and with the staff teams who work with them. Formerly president of the International Association for Forensic Psychotherapy (IAFP), she is the author of The Psychology of Female Violence: Crimes Against the Body.

The book deals with the causes of violence in women, what can be done to help them and their victims and explores why society denies the fact of female violence.

This book explores the nature and causes of female violence from the perspectives of psychodynamic theory and forensic psychology. The book explores recent high-profile cases of female violence, including the case of Victoria Climbié, the controversy related to the diagnosis of Münchausen syndrome by proxy, Dangerous and severe personality disorder in women, and the impact of pro-anorexia and pro-bulimia websites.

The book also explores other major topics, including the sexual and physical abuse of children by women, infanticide, fabricated and induced illness, and self-harm.

References

External links
 Crimes Against The Body - Anna Motz's website
 article quoting Anna Motz extensively on Baby P

1964 births
Living people
American women psychologists
21st-century American psychologists
Place of birth missing (living people)
Nationality missing
21st-century American women
20th-century American psychologists